Monastyrskaya is a rural locality (a village) in Kisnemskoye Rural Settlement, Vashkinsky District, Vologda Oblast, Russia. The population was 17 as of 2002.

Geography 
Monastyrskaya is located 24 km northwest of Lipin Bor (the district's administrative centre) by road. Troitskoye is the nearest rural locality.

References 

Rural localities in Vashkinsky District